Andesobia boliviana is a species of moth of the subfamily Arctiinae first described by Max Gaede in 1923. It is found in Peru and Bolivia.

References

Moths described in 1923
Spilosomina
Moths of South America